Chris Garten is an American politician, businessman, and retired military officer serving as a member of the Indiana Senate from the 45th district. He assumed office on November 7, 2018.

Early life and education 
A native of Scottsburg, Indiana, Garten graduated from Scottsburg Senior High School in 2000. He attended Marine Corps University and Indiana University Southeast, but did not earn a degree.

Career 
Garten served as a gunnery sergeant in the United States Marine Corps Reserves for 14 years, including two tours in Iraq. In 2007, Garten founded Signature Countertops Inc. in Jeffersonville, Indiana. Garten was elected to the Indiana Senate in November 2018. He also serves as the ranking member of the Senate Public Policy Committee.

References 

Living people
People from Scott County, Indiana
United States Marine Corps non-commissioned officers
People from Jeffersonville, Indiana
Republican Party Indiana state senators
Year of birth missing (living people)
United States Marine Corps personnel of the Iraq War
Marine Corps University alumni
Indiana University Southeast alumni